Berlin Museum may refer to:

 Museum Island
 Altes Museum
 Antikensammlung Berlin
 Egyptian Museum of Berlin
 Neues Museum
 Pergamon Museum
 Vorderasiatisches Museum Berlin

See also
 List of museums and galleries in Berlin